Project Mercury is a split album by Rosetta and Balboa. The title is derived from the 1959 United States human spaceflight of the same name. It was released on April 24, 2007 through the now defunct record label Level Plane.

Track listing

Personnel
Rosetta
 Michael Armine – sound manipulation, vocals
 David Grossman – bass, vocals
 Bruce McMurtrie Jr. – drums
 J. Matthew Weed – guitar, violin

Balboa
 Peter Bloom - vocals
 Armando Morales - bass
 Dave Pacifico – guitar
 Drew Juergens – drums

Samples
 Mike Armine on "TMA-1" and "Project Mercury"

Production
 Mastered by Alan Douches

Artwork
 Art design by Paul Jeffrey

References

2007 albums
Balboa (band) albums
Level Plane Records albums
Rosetta (band) albums
Split albums